Utricularia lasiocaulis is an annual terrestrial carnivorous plant that belongs to the genus Utricularia (family Lentibulariaceae). Its distribution ranges from Western Australia through the Northern Territory and into Queensland, Australia.

The species was named by Victorian Government botanist Ferdinand von Mueller in 1885 and is characterised by large fanlike flowers in violet and yellow.

See also 
 List of Utricularia species

References 

Carnivorous plants of Australia
Flora of Queensland
Flora of the Northern Territory
Eudicots of Western Australia
lasiocaulis
Lamiales of Australia
Taxa named by Ferdinand von Mueller